Clytie infrequens is a moth of the family Erebidae first described by Charles Swinhoe in 1884. It is found in eremic (desert) areas from the eastern Sahara through the Arabian Peninsula to Pakistan and India.

There are multiple generations per year. Adults are on wing year round.

The larvae feed on Tamarix species.

External links

Image

Ophiusina
Moths described in 1884
Moths of Africa
Moths of Asia